Zimbabwe Division 1 is the second division of the Zimbabwe Football Association.

The League consists of 64 teams.

League members 2014

Central Zimbabwe
Mimosa FC
Chapungu United F.C.
Border Strikers
Hardbody FC
Gweru Pirates
Silo United
Tongogara
Chrome Stars
Bvm FC
ZISCO Steel
Mc Inn
Mateta
Rutendo Stars
Air Stars
Cmed Justice

See also
Zimbabwe Premier Soccer League

References

External links

Football leagues in Zimbabwe
Second level football leagues in Africa